The 1996 Finnish Cup was the 42nd season of the main annual association football cup competition in Finland. It was organised as a single-elimination knock–out tournament and participation in the competition was voluntary.  The final was held at the Olympic Stadium, Helsinki on 3 November 1996 with HJK defeating TPS by 1-1 before an attendance of 3,632 spectators.

Early rounds 
Not currently available.

Round 8

Quarter-finals

Semi-finals

Final

References

External links
 Suomen Cup Official site 

Finnish Cup seasons
Finnish Cup, 1996
Finnish Cup, 1996